is a private secondary school in the city of Niigata, Niigata Prefecture, Japan.

History
The school was established in 1921.

In 2004, the campus moved from Kawagishi-chō in Chūō-ku (near Hakusan Station) to Kitayama in Kōnan-ku (near Kameda Station).

In 2007, the junior high school was founded in addition to the existing senior high school.

Notable alumni
Toku, musician
Fujisawa Shu, writer

References

External links
  
 Niigata Meikun Junior High School Official website 

High schools in Niigata Prefecture
Schools in Niigata Prefecture
Educational institutions established in 1921
1921 establishments in Japan
Niigata (city)